St Modan was the son of an Irish chieftain. He became a monk and built a chapel at Dryburgh, Scotland, in 522 which he used as a base for several years. This later became the site of a monastery: Dryburgh Abbey.

He actively proselytised on behalf of the Celtic church in the Falkirk and Stirling areas, and along the Forth, continuing until he was elected abbot, a post which he accepted reluctantly. After a number of years he resigned and became a hermit, settling in the Dumbarton area, where he would die. His relics were enshrined at Saint Modan's church, Rosneath.

His feast day is February 4.

External links
Catholic Online entry
Another entry

6th-century deaths
History of the Scottish Borders
History of Stirling (council area)
History of Falkirk (council area)
History of West Dunbartonshire
History of Argyll and Bute
6th-century Christian saints
6th-century Irish people
Medieval Irish saints
Medieval Scottish saints
Irish Christian monks
Year of birth unknown
Medieval Scottish clergy